Doc McGhee is an American music manager, best known for working with hard rock bands Kiss, Bon Jovi and Mötley Crüe. The latter two groups experienced their rise to stardom under his management. He has also worked with Hootie & the Blowfish.

He was in a reality series for VH1 called Supergroup along with Scott Ian, Ted Nugent, Evan Seinfeld, Sebastian Bach and Jason Bonham.  He was also seen on the AMC reality series 4th and Loud, which chronicled his, Gene Simmons', and Paul Stanley's roles as owners of the Los Angeles Kiss Arena Football League team.

Moscow Music Peace Festival 
In 1989 McGhee joined with Russian musician and promotor Stas Namin to create the Moscow Music Peace Festival which brought together hard rock and metal bands from the United States, Europe and Russia to benefit programs to help drug addicts. Over 100,000 people attended and it was broadcast in 59 countries. The concert inspired one of the bands, the McGhee-managed Scorpions, to write the top-selling song Wind of Change.

Drug smuggling conviction
In November 1982, McGhee was arrested for contributing to the import of 20 tons of marijuana into North Carolina via shrimp boat. The 21-count indictment said that McGhee and the smugglers had the intent to distribute the marijuana. McGhee would have to serve 30 years in jail and be fined $140,000, but the possession-with-intent-to-sell charge was changed. Identified as a link between US smugglers and the Colombian drug suppliers, McGhee pleaded guilty and was ordered to spend $250,000 and 3,000 hours dedicated to his Make a Difference Foundation, a non-profit aimed at deterring youth drug use. After the sentence, neither McGhee nor his office would comment on the sentencing.

Bands managed
 Niteflyte (1978–1982)
 Pat Travers  (1978-1981)
 Mötley Crüe (1982–1989)
 Bon Jovi (1984–1991)
 Guns N' Roses (2010–2011)
 Kiss (1995–)
 Skid Row (1988–)
 The Front (1989–1994)
 Hootie & the Blowfish
 Scorpions
 Benise
 Jypsi (2007–2010)
 Nico Vega (2009–2010)
 Night Ranger (2007–)
 Crooked X (2007–2008)
 Vintage Trouble (2010–)
 TNT
 Drew Davis Band
 Down
 Chasin' Crazy (2015–2016)

Solo artists managed
 Bonnie McKee (2004–2009)
 Cheyenne Kimball (2007–)
 Darius Rucker
 Ted Nugent
 Paul Stanley
 Sacha Edwards
 Bob Schnieder
 Richie Sambora
 Yoshiki
 Orianthi
 Mallary Hope

Discography

References

External links
McGhee Entertainment
 
Interview with Doc McGhee - The Unwritable Rant podcast

American music industry executives
American music managers
Living people
Participants in American reality television series
Place of birth missing (living people)
Year of birth missing (living people)